Drosedower Bek is a river of Mecklenburg-Vorpommern, Germany. It connects the Rätzsee with the Gobenowsee.

See also
List of rivers of Mecklenburg-Vorpommern

Rivers of Mecklenburg-Western Pomerania
Rivers of Germany